The Rivers State Independent Electoral Commission (RSIEC), is a statutory body constituted by the Government of Rivers State, Nigeria, under section 5(a) of the Independent Electoral Commission Law (2000) to oversee the implementation of election procedures. Headquartered in Port Harcourt, the Commission's primary function is "to organize, undertake and supervise all elections to local government councils within the state." It consists of 7 members who are appointed by the Governor of Rivers State with confirmation by the Rivers State House of Assembly.

Departments
The RSIEC is divided into the following departments:

Media and Public Affairs
Finance, Accounts and Legal Services
Ad-hoc Recruitment 
Training and Deployment
Political Affairs and Monitoring
Election Planning and Monitoring
Works, Transport and Logistics

RSIEC Chairmen
Sam Jaja (2000 - 2004)
Nimi Briggs (2007 - 2011)
Augustine Ahiauzu (2012 – 2015)
Chukwunenye Uriri (2015 - 2020)
George O. Omereji (2020 - till date)

References

External links 
 Official site

Politics of Rivers State
Election commissions in Nigeria
Organizations based in Rivers State
Government agencies and parastatals of Rivers State